Belapur Ki Dayan is a Pakistani supernatural horror drama series directed by Saife Hassan, and written by Inam Hasan. It features Sarah Khan, Adnan Siddiqui, Osama Tahir in leads whilst Amar Khan played the main antagonist.

Synopsis 
The story revolves around Aziz (Shakeel) who has recently moved to his ancestral home after winning a 32-year-long court battle with his step brother. In the house, his whole family is disturbed with the supernatural presence, which turns out to be the spirit of his step sister Nilofar (Amar Khan). Nilofar wants to take revenge from him for a wrongdoing in the past. Thus she tortures and disturbs the life of his family for living in her home. She corrupts the souls of Natasha, aka Tasha (Sarah Khan), the daughter of Aziz, and possesses her body to affect her life negatively. In the meanwhile, the lives of Aziz's son Rameez (Osama Tahir), his wife Aliya (Rayyan Ibrahim), son Wajdan (Nitesh Narayan) and daughter Mannat (Shifa), are deeply disturbed by the supernatural spirits, especially Nelofar. Aziz decides to tame Nilofar and seeks the help of her ex-lover Shakir (Adnan Siddiqui) for Tasha's treatment. What will the family experience now?

Cast 
 Adnan Siddiqui as Shakir 
 Sarah Khan as Natasha aka Tasha 
 Amar Khan as Neelofur/Dayan
 Osama Tahir as Rameez
 Shakeel as Aziz Ahmed (Old)
 Irfan Khoosat as Rehmat (Old)
 Rayyan Ibrahim as Aliya
 Ismat Zaidi as Salima
 Rashid Mehmood as Karamat (Dead)
 Sajida Syed as Raeesa
 Rashid Farooqui as Inspector Boota
 Akbar Islam as Sikander (Dead)
 Umar Naru as Rehmat (Young)
 Shahjahan Rana as Aziz (Young)
 Hira Soomro as Rabiya (Dead)
 Shifa as Mannat (Child star) 
 Nitesh Narayan as Wajdan (Child star)
 Akhtar Ghazali as Wakil sahab (lawyer)

Production 
Amar in an interview said; "I’m playing characters from two different time periods, one of a fragile innocent girl of the 80’s reading Parveen Shakir’s shayari and the other, a current time period sarcastic and ruthless Dayan who is there to attain revenge,"[ ... ]"It’s been given very realistic treatment. My director’s very much hanging me with cables in the air and he’s making me do all these acrobats, so it’s no longer a bedroom drama where I shed a tear or two, or even play a glamorous nagin; nothing of such sort."

While Adnan shared with The News about his character "I play the dayan’s love interest in the project,"[ ... ] "After her death, I am called in the same house by the owner whose daughter is being haunted and I am there to save her. I will be seen in 10 episodes and the drama takes you into flashbacks and then in present."

Awards

References

External links 
 Official Website

Pakistani drama television series
2018 Pakistani television series debuts
Pakistani television series endings
Pakistani horror fiction television series